Yeo Min-jeong may refer to:

 Yeo Min-jeong (voice actress) (born 1975), South Korean voice actress.
 Yeo Min-jeong (actress) (born 1986), South Korean actress.